Santa Caterina is a Baroque-style, Roman Catholic church located on Piazza Castello #36, in Casale Monferrato, Province of Alessandria, region of Piedmont, Italy.

History 
This church was erected for Dominican nuns and consecrated in 1726. The architect was Giacomo Zanetti using designs by Giovanni Battista Scapitta. The highly decorated facade is in close proximity to the elliptical dome. The interiors were frescoed by Giovanni Carlo Aliberti who painted the Saints and Allegories of the Virtues, while the dome was painted by lesser-known painters Benaschi and Vittore. The statue of the Virgin of the Assumption (1780) on the main altar was sculpted by Giovanni Battista Bernero.

An association dedicated to the restoration of the church is active in 2016.

References 

Roman Catholic churches in Casale Monferrato
17th-century Roman Catholic church buildings in Italy
18th-century Roman Catholic church buildings in Italy
Baroque architecture in Piedmont